Boa Esperança do Sul is a municipality in the Brazilian state of São Paulo.

History

Boa Esperança do Sul was known as São Sebastião de Boa Esperança since the late 19th-century.  In July 1895, it became a district, with the name of Boa Esperança.  In 1944, it was renamed Boa Esperança do Sul.

Government

 Mayor: Marcão Rosim (2013–2016)

Geography

Rivers
 Boa Esperança River
 Jacaré Pepira River
 Jacaré-Guaçu River

Demography

Its population in 2020 was 15,018 inhabitants.

Total population: 13,750 (2011 Census)
 Urban: 10,753
 Rural: 1,820
 Men: 6,391
 Women: 6,182
 Density (inhabitants/km2): 18.81
 Infant mortality up to 1 year old (per thousand): 17.78
 Life expectancy (years): 70.23
 Fertility rate (children per woman): 2.79
 Literacy rate: 85.65%
 Human Development Index (HDI): 0.755
 Income: 0.688
 Longevity: 0.754
 Education: 0,822

Economy

Its economy is based on agriculture, especially coffee, cotton, sugarcane, maize, soya beans plantations, agribusiness, dairy, and beef cattle.

Transport

 SP-255 Highway

References

External links

Boa Esperança do Sul at WikiMapia

Municipalities in São Paulo (state)
1895 establishments in Brazil